Kemayoran is a district of Central Jakarta, Jakarta in Indonesia. It was best known for the former Kemayoran Airport. It has been transforming as a new Central business district. As of 2022, it consists of numerous four and five star hotels, restaurants, premium office towers, hospitals as well as shopping and entertainment centers. Kemayoran is also home to the Jakarta Fair, the largest and longest fair in Southeast Asia that attracts more than 4 million visitors annually.

Kemayoran is between Jalan M.H. Thamrin, Ancol Dreamland and the Port of Tanjung Priok.  Its proximity between Jakarta's primary central business district, a Southeast Asian tourist hotspot and the one of the busiest port in the world  has made Kemayoran a prime real estate for many local and foreign investors.  Moreover, Kemayoran is 20 minutes journey from Soekarno-Hatta International Airport.

Kemayoran is serviced by Trans-Java Toll Road, which traverses the island of Java.  As of 2022 the government has finished the construction of the Light Rail Transit (LRT) station in Kemayoran with the rest of Jakarta by that means.

Sub-district
The district of Kemayoran has eight sub-districts; having the postal/zip/area codes as follows:

History

Even though the area that was known as Batavia stretches from Tangerang to Bogor, physical development is still limited to the area near the city center around the Sunda Kelapa harbor area. Limitations of this development is partly due to the condition of Batavia being a walled city with fortifications because of many attacks from local Sultanates to seize Batavia, as well as because of the centralized system of the government. Only in 1810 that the city wall of Batavia was demolished, during the reign of Daendels. Meanwhile, rural areas and suburbs of Batavia are still largely 'untouched' with several native villages. These rural areas were later shared to several landlords, one of which is the area that is now known as Kemayoran.

The area that was known as Kemayoran was formerly a land owned by the Dutch East India Company commander, Isaac de l'Ostal de Saint-Martin (ca. 1629–96). At the end of the 17th century, Isaac owned a large area in Java,  which includes the area that is now Kemayoran, part of Ancol, Krukut at Tegalangus, and Cinere. Isaac held the title major, which is where the name Kemayoran come from. The name Mayoran first appears in Java Government Gazette on February 24, 1816, described as "a land close to Weltevreden". Later, the area was known as Kemayoran until now.

Until the early 20th century, Kemayoran was still dominated by swamps and paddies with small settlements. Administratively, Kemayoran was a Weekmeester governed by a Bek ("Defender"). After the independence of Indonesia, Kemayoran became part of the Sawah Besar district in Penjaringan, Jakarta Raya. From 1963 to 1968, Kemayoran was part of the district of Senen in Jakarta Raya. Ever since 1968, Kemayoran became a district of Central Jakarta.

At first, the inhabitants of Kemayoran were natives from a mixture of several ethnic group from the local kingdom of Pajajaran, Demak, Mataram, and several foreign nations who arrived as immigrants. After the Dutch occupied, there are immigrants from China, India, Sumatra, and East Indonesia that are used as workers for the expansion and development of Batavia or to participate in military service against Sultan Hasanuddin and Sultan Agung of Mataram.

Under the government of Daendels, in order to collect funds for the construction of the new Anyer-Panarukan road, some lands were sold to private owners. Generally, the buyers were Dutch, Chinese and Arabic origin. Among them was Roosendaal, H. Hussein Madani (Indo-Dutch), Abdullah, and De Groof. These landlords had the power to regulate land from users, who were indigenous population and serf. After slavery was abolished, these people became farmers who worked for the landlords, then the landlords would determine the taxes to be paid.

Until 1903, Batavia moved to a decentralized form of government, which marked the period of modern colonialism of Batavia. Many lands are repaired, canals are constructed, and the city is expanded. Lands are purchased for the expansion of the city, which included the settlements of Kemayoran, Petojo, Jatibaru, Cideng, Kramat, and Tanah Tinggi. These lands were allocated for lower-middle-class people. More affluent citizens such as the Dutch people and other higher class people live closer to the center, such as in the Menteng residential area.

Many of the people who resided in Kemayoran were Indo people (mixed Dutch and Indonesian). Most of them lived in Jl. Garuda. Even after World War II, many former Dutch soldiers settled in Kemayoran. Around the 1930s, Kemayoran was known as a settlement of the Indo people, giving rise to a new nickname for Kemayoran, "Belanda Kemayoran" (roughly translates to Kemayoran Netherlands). After Indonesian independence, a wave of urban migrants arrived in Kemayoran and Jakarta from various regions in Indonesia such as West Java, Central Java, Sumatra, Kalimantan, East Nusa Tenggara, and West Nusa Tenggara. Because of this, Kemayoran transformed into a more crowded settlements.

In 1935, Kemayoran Airport was opened. This started to change the economy of Kemayoran from agriculture to service, but many areas of Kemayoran was still a sparsely distributed settlement with vacant land. With the opening of the Soekarno-Hatta International Airport and the closure of the Kemayoran Airport, Kemayoran was able to be transformed to the new central business district of Jakarta.  Since then, many entertainment centres, hotels and offices were built. The government added numerous infrastructure such as the Light rail and  Trans-Java Toll Road, to support the rapid growth of the central business district of Kemayoran.

Kota Baru Bandara Kemayoran

In 1986, Kemayoran Airport was officially closed. In accordance with the 2015-2019 National Medium-Term Long-Term Development Plan (RPJMN), the Ministry of Public Works and Public Housing (PUPR) proposes Kemayoran, to be an area that has the opportunity to become a new city. The area that was formerly an airport was gradually turned into other developments such as Jakarta International Expo and Kotabaru Bandar Kemayoran (both of these were actually located in Pademangan district in North Jakarta instead of Kemayoran district in Central Jakarta. Kemayoran Planning and Development Center (PPK) is responsible for development as well as monitoring of the area.

Kota Baru has an area of 454 hectares. At present there are several vertical residential designation blocks, office blocks, hospitals, shopping center blocks as well as five and four star hotels. There is also an urban park of 22.3 hectares area which has lake, mangrove area, an amphitheater, viewing towers, jogging tracks, a hanging bridge.

Government and infrastructure
Government agencies with head offices in Kemayoran include the National Search and Rescue Agency.

Culture

Many ingenious cultures, especially the Betawi culture, flourished in Kemayoran. Among them is the kroncong music, a mixture of indigenous music and Portuguese fado music. Kroncong Tugu, a variation of kroncong that originally came from Tugu (about 12 km east of present Jakarta), is a variation that is closely associated with Kemayoran. Because of rapid development Kemayoran has transformed into a modern city itself. Consequently, cultural values such as the Betawi culture is threatened.

Gambang music also developed in Kemayoran under the influence of China. The variation of gambang that developed in Kemayoran is often called Gambang Kemayoran and it is not referred to as Gambang Kromong because the kromong (a kind of percussion) is not used. Songs that are popular at the time including Onde-onde, Si Jongkong Kopyor, and Kapal Karem.

The Wayang Kulit of Kemayoran originates from Javanese influences. The main difference is that the language used is the Betawi language instead of Javanese language. During the colonial era, Wayang Kulit was usually performed at ceremonies such as wedding ceremony, circumcision ceremony, and New Year party.

One of the popular artist associated with Kemayoran theater is Benyamin Sueb.

Pencak silat, a martial art of the Betawi people, also became popular in Kemayoran. Styles of pencak silat developed in Kemayoran area are Beksi, Cingkrik, Si tembak, Sin lam ba, and Kolong meja. Until late 80's, it is a common routine for children to practice pencak silat after the Isha prayers.

During the 1990s, many of the traditional art and culture of Betawi characteristic of Kemayoran slowly disappeared.

Folklore
There are many folklores associated with Kemayoran, usually involving the conflict between the indigenous people of Kemayoran and the Dutch kompeni (local term for Dutch East India Company who applied huge taxes to the local people.) One of the popular hero from the legend is Murtado "Si Macan Kemayoran" ("the Kemayoran Tiger") who protected the Kemayoran village area against the Dutch East India Company henchmen and the local bully who oppressed the villagers.

Transportation
Kemayoran can be reached by bus, train, taxi, or Angkot. Kemayoran station of Jakarta metro rail is located in the area. The area is served by Transjakarta corridor 12.

List of important places
Kemayoran Athletes Village
Kemayoran railway station
Southern part of Kemayoran Airport

References

Districts of Jakarta
Central Jakarta